Ryan Jefforey Mathews (born October 10, 1987) is an American former football running back. He played college football at Fresno State. He was drafted by the San Diego Chargers in the first round, 12th overall, in the 2010 NFL Draft. He was selected to the Pro Bowl in 2011.

Early years
Mathews was born in Riverside, California to Tricia Mathews when she was 16. His father left before he was born and has only seen him a few times in his life. For the first four months of his life, Mathews and his mother lived out of her 1969 Oldsmobile. His mother is Caucasian and his father is African-American.

As a child, he and his mother moved to Tehachapi, a small city 35 miles southeast of Bakersfield, to be closer to family. Once there, she took on several jobs to provide a decent life for her son.

He began playing football at age five, and Tricia never missed a game.

After junior high school, he moved to Bakersfield to face tougher athletic competition.

High school career
Mathews attended West High School in Bakersfield, California, where he played football and ran track. He played running back, quarterback, and linebacker for the Vikings football. As a junior, he led West High to a CIF championship while rushing for 1,104 yards and 18 touchdowns on offense and totaling 97 tackles and 16 sacks on defense. Following the season, he was an All-State underclass selection. As a senior, Mathews led the nation with 3,396 rushing yards (9.97 yards per attempt) and 44 touchdowns as a running back, along with 851 passing yards and 11 touchdowns as a quarterback. After his senior season, he was named first team All-State and a second team All-American. In track & field, Mathews competed in hurdles (personal-best of 15.99 in the 110m hurdles) and relays (43.13 in the 4 × 100 m). In addition, he also ran a 4.5-second 40-yard dash and had a 32-inch vertical.

Regarded as a three-star recruit, many Pac-10 and Big 12 schools had interest in him, but backed away because of fears he would not be academically eligible. Fresno State remained in the recruiting scene and eventually Mathews signed with them. He was also teammates with CFL cornerback AJ Jefferson

College career
Mathews attended California State University, Fresno from 2007 to 2009. As a freshman in 2007, Mathews rushed for 866 yards on 145 carries and scored 14 touchdowns. His rushing yard average and touchdowns led all NCAA freshmen.

As a sophomore in 2008, he ranked in the top 10 in the NCAA in rushing yards and touchdowns after four games. In the fourth game against UCLA, he ran for 166 yards and scored two touchdowns before leaving with a knee injury. After the injury, he missed most of the next three games and sat out the final five. He finished the season with 606 yards on 113 carries and 8 touchdowns.

As a junior in 2009, Mathews led college football in rushing with an average of 150.67 yards per game in 12 games. He totaled 1,808 yards on 276 carries and 19 touchdowns. He missed one game due to a concussion.

Following the regular season, he was given numerous individual awards, including being named first team all-WAC and a second team All-American by CBS Sports, Sports Illustrated, and the Associated Press.

In December 2009, Mathews decided to forgo his senior season and enter the 2010 NFL Draft. His 1,808 yards rushing ranks him behind only LaDainian Tomlinson and George Jones in the WAC season record books.

Professional career

2010 NFL Draft
Mathews was drafted by the San Diego Chargers with the 12th overall pick in the 2010 NFL Draft. He is the third highest Fresno State Bulldog to be drafted since David Carr went 1st overall in the 2002 NFL Draft and Trent Dilfer went 6th overall in the 1994 NFL Draft.

Nate Cohn of The New York Times in 2022 listed Mathews and Anthony Barr as the only two of 19 top NFL draft picks since 2005 whose careers justified being chosen much earlier than their ESPN draft ranking.

San Diego Chargers

On August 1, 2010, Mathews signed a five-year, $26.65 million contract with the Chargers. The deal included $15 million guaranteed.
Mathews struggled during his rookie season, but received praise for his improved play as a 2nd-year running back. He finished with 1,091 rushing yards and six touchdowns and made the Pro Bowl as an alternate for Ray Rice.

On August 9, 2012, Mathews broke his right clavicle on his first carry in the first preseason game of 2012 against the Green Bay Packers. He was expected to be out for 4–6 weeks. On September 23, Mathews returned from his collarbone injury in Week 3 of the regular season. In the 27-3 loss to the Atlanta Falcons, Mathews made his season debut and  rushed for 44 yards on 10 carries and caught 5 passes for 32 yards. However, he had a fumble inside the Falcons' 5-yard line. In the following game against Kansas City, Jackie Battle started instead of Mathews. Battle was in 27 plays compared to Mathews' 21, with most of Mathews work in the fourth quarter when San Diego's victory was mostly already decided. U-T San Diego wrote that Mathews would have been expected to start were it not for his fumble against Atlanta. On December 16 against the Carolina Panthers, Mathews broke his left clavicle and was placed on season-ending injured reserve for the remainder of the 2012 season.

In 2013, Mathews did not miss a game due to injury for the first time in his career. He led the NFL with six 100-yard games, and set a career-high in rushing yards with 1,255 that season; it was the most yards by a Charger since Tomlinson’s 1,474 in 2007. Mathews led the NFL in both carries (121) and yards rushing (534) for the month of December, and ran for 100 yards in three of the final four games of the season. He fell short with 99 yards in a 26–13 win against the Oakland Raiders, when he also injured his left ankle. The following week in the regular season finale, he ran for a career-high 144 yards in a 27–24 overtime win over Kansas City that qualified San Diego for the playoffs. It was the Chargers' first postseason appearance since Mathews was drafted in 2010. The team won 27–10 in a wild-card round win against the Cincinnati Bengals. Mathews had 52 yards on 13 carries, but ran the ball just once in the second half due to his injured ankle.  It was the second consecutive week he was a limited practice participant on Friday before playing on Sunday. Still hurting, he started the following game against the Denver Broncos despite being unable to practice the entire week. However, he was limited to five carries and 26 yards and left the game in the second quarter in a 24–17 Chargers loss.

Mathews missed seven games in 2014 after he sustained a sprained MCL in Week 2 against the Seattle Seahawks. After suffering an ankle sprain in Week 14 against the New England Patriots, he missed the remainder of the regular season.

Philadelphia Eagles

Mathews signed a three-year deal with the Philadelphia Eagles on March 12, 2015. However, the Eagles also signed NFL rushing champion DeMarco Murray and already had Darren Sproles, who scored six rushing touchdowns on limited carries in 2014. However, Murray played poorly in the first two games of the season, rushing for 11 yards on 21 carries, although Mathews was not much better, rushing for 4 yards on 4 carries and 1 touchdown, while Sproles led the team with 46 yards on 6 carries. When Murray went down with a hamstring injury in week 3, Mathews stepped up against the 2-0 New York Jets and rushed for 108 yards on 24 carries while catching a 23-yard receiving touchdown. When Murray returned in week 4, Mathews was again the backup, while Murray had another sub-par game. In Week 5, Murray rushed for 83 yards on 20 carries leading the team in rushing, but Mathews was only ten yards behind with only 8 carries, and he also had a touchdown. Mathew's best performance was against the then undefeated Carolina Panthers, where he rushed for 97 yards on 6 carries. Mathews' chances of starting were damaged when he was knocked out with a concussion in a 20-19 loss to the Miami Dolphins, which led to Darren Sproles becoming the feature back. Upon his return, he played on an average level, but had a good game against the 11-2 Arizona Cardinals (11 carries for 53 yards) and finally won the starting job. Ultimately, he lost his starting job to DeMarco Murray in a Week 16 loss to the Redskins, where he had 4 carries for 5 yards and a touchdown. Through an up and down season, Mathews finished by leading the team in rushing TDs with 6, as well as compiling 539 rushing yards on 106 carries, a 5.1 average.

In 2016, Mathews played in 13 games with 8 starts, finishing the season with 661 rushing yards and eight touchdowns along with 13 receptions for 115 yards and one touchdown. He was placed on injured reserve on December 27, 2016 after suffering a herniated disc during a game against the New York Giants in Week 16.

On August 15, 2017, Mathews was released by the Eagles after recovering from offseason neck surgery.

NFL career statistics

Personal life
Mathews grew up as a fan of the San Diego Chargers since childhood and is a fan of LaDainian Tomlinson, particularly because of his running style. He wore No. 21 in high school and at Fresno State in honor of Tomlinson.

He is also a member of Sigma Phi Epsilon fraternity.

References

External links

Philadelphia Eagles biography
San Diego Chargers biography
Fresno State Bulldogs biography

1987 births
Living people
Players of American football from Bakersfield, California
American football running backs
Fresno State Bulldogs football players
San Diego Chargers players
Philadelphia Eagles players
American Conference Pro Bowl players